Gary L. Stewart, born February 26, 1953, in Stockton, California, was the Imperator of AMORC from 1987 to 1990.  After internal allegations of embezzlement, Stewart was ousted as leader by the organization's board of directors. On August 10, 1993, the AMORC asked the Superior Court of Santa Clara County in California for the withdrawal of charges against him and paid for the existing legal fees. In 1996, Stewart founded another organization devoted to Rosicrucianism called Confraternity of the Rose + Cross of which he is the current Imperator.
Gary L. Stewart is also the "Knight Commander" of the Order of the Militia Crucifera Evangelica (OMCE) Sovereign Grand Master of the Order of British Martinist (BMO)- British Martinist Order. Currently, the British Order Martinist is active only in the English-speaking countries. The other NGOs are active in the United States of America, United Kingdom, Ghana, Brazil, Australia and other countries.

Other AMORC Imperators 
Harvey Spencer Lewis
Ralph Maxwell Lewis
Christian Bernard
Claudio Mazzucco

External links 
An interview with G. L. Stewart (official from CR+C)
A member of AMORC and CR+C on the 1990s AMORC vs. CR+C Debate (unofficial)

1953 births
Living people
People from Stockton, California
American businesspeople